Tanya Gallagher is an American indie folk singer-songwriter from Pensacola, Florida.

Career

Gallagher released her first solo album, Oh My Love, in 2013. In 2016, she released her second solo album, Virginia. 

In July 2019, Gallagher released a six-track EP, One Hand on my Heart. The album was produced by Daniel Mendez of Head Above Water Music  at Matchbox Studios  in Austin, Texas.

Discography
It's Been So Long (Baylen, 2007)
Oh My Love (Solo Album, 2013)
Virginia (Solo Album, 2016)
One Hand on my Heart (Solo EP, 2019)

References

Year of birth missing (living people)
Living people
Indie folk musicians
Singers from Florida
University of West Florida alumni